Maryfield (foaled April 13, 2001 in Ontario) is a retired Hall of Fame and Champion Thoroughbred racehorse.

Trained by Doug O'Neill, she raced for her American owners in the United States. In 2007, Maryfield became only the fourth Canadian-bred horse to ever win a Breeders' Cup race when she captured the Filly & Mare Sprint, hosted that year by Monmouth Park Racetrack. She was voted the 2007 Eclipse Award for American Champion Female Sprint Horse and in 2009 was inducted in the Canadian Horse Racing Hall of Fame.

References
 Maryfield's profile at Breeders' Cup
 Video at Breeders Cup.com of Maryfield winning the 2007 Breeders' Cup Filly and Mare Sprint

2001 racehorse births
Racehorses bred in Canada
Racehorses trained in the United States
Breeders' Cup Filly & Mare Sprint winners
Eclipse Award winners
Canadian Horse Racing Hall of Fame inductees
Thoroughbred family 22-d